Tricalysia is a genus of flowering plants in the family Rubiaceae. The genus is found in tropical and southern Africa and on the islands in the Western Indian Ocean.

Species

 Tricalysia achoundongiana Robbr., Sonké & Kenfack 	 
 Tricalysia aciculiflora Robbr.  	 
 Tricalysia acocantheroides K.Schum.  	 
 Tricalysia allocalyx Robbr.  	 
 Tricalysia ambrensis Ranariv. & De Block  	 
 Tricalysia amplexicaulis Robbr.  	 
 Tricalysia analamazaotrensis Homolle ex Ranariv. & De Block  	 
 Tricalysia angolensis A.Rich. ex DC.  	 
 Tricalysia anomala E.A.Bruce  	 
 Tricalysia atherura N.Hallé  	 
 Tricalysia bagshawei S.Moore  	 
 Tricalysia biafrana Hiern  	 
 Tricalysia bifida De Wild.  	 
 Tricalysia boiviniana (Baill.) Ranariv. & De Block  	 
 Tricalysia bridsoniana Robbr.  	 
 Tricalysia capensis (Meisn. ex Hochst.) Sim  	 
 T. capensis var. galpinii (Schinz) Robbr.  	 
 Tricalysia coriacea (Benth.) Hiern  	 
 T. coriacea subsp. angustifolia (J.G.García) Robbr.  	 
 T. coriacea subsp. coriacea	 
 T. coriacea subsp. nyassae (Hiern) Bridson  	 
 Tricalysia cryptocalyx Baker  	 
 Tricalysia dauphinensis Ranariv. & De Block  	 
 Tricalysia delagoensis Schinz  	 
 Tricalysia elegans Robbr.  	 
 Tricalysia elliottii (K.Schum.) Hutch. & Dalziel  	 
 T. elliottii var. centrafricana Robbr.  	 
 T. elliottii var. elliottii
 Tricalysia elmar Cheek 
 Tricalysia fangana (N.Hallé) Robbr.  	 
 Tricalysia faranahensis Aubrév. & Pellegr.  	 
 Tricalysia ferorum Robbr.  	 
 Tricalysia fililoba K.Krause  	 
 Tricalysia gilchristii Brenan  	 
 Tricalysia griseiflora K.Schum.  	 
 T. griseiflora var. benguellensis (Welw. ex Hiern) Robbr.  	 
 Tricalysia hensii De Wild.  	 
 Tricalysia humbertii Ranariv. & De Block  	 
 Tricalysia idiura N.Hallé  	 
 Tricalysia ignota Bridson  	 
 Tricalysia jasminiflora (Klotzsch) Benth. & Hook.f. ex Hiern  	 
 Tricalysia jasminiflora var. jasminiflora  	 
 Tricalysia kivuensis Robbr.  	 
 Tricalysia landanensis R.D.Good  	 
 Tricalysia lasiodelphys (K.Schum. & K.Krause) A.Chev.  	 
 T. lasiodelphys subsp. anomalura (N.Hallé) Robbr.  	 
 Tricalysia ledermannii K.Krause  	 
 Tricalysia lejolyana Sonké & Cheek  	 
 Tricalysia leucocarpa (Baill.) Ranariv. & De Block  	 
 Tricalysia lineariloba Hutch.  	 
 Tricalysia longipaniculata R.D.Good  	 
 Tricalysia longituba De Wild.  	 
 T. longituba subsp. longituba
 Tricalysia lophocarpa O.Lachenaud  	
 Tricalysia madagascariensis (Drake ex Dubard) A.Chev.  	 
 Tricalysia majungensis Ranariv. & De Block  	 
 Tricalysia micrantha Hiern  	 
 Tricalysia microphylla Hiern  	 
 Tricalysia niamniamensis Schweinf. ex Hiern  	 
 T. niamniamensis subsp. niamniamensis 	 
 T. niamniamensis subsp. nodosa (Robbr.) Bridson  	 
 Tricalysia obanensis Keay 
 Tricalysia obovata O.Lachenaud  	 
 Tricalysia obstetrix N.Hallé  	 
 Tricalysia okelensis Hiern  	 
 T. okelensis var. okelensis
 Tricalysia oligoneura K.Schum.  	 
 Tricalysia orientalis Ranariv. & De Block  	 
 Tricalysia pallens Hiern  	 
 T. pallens var. dundensis (Cavaco) N.Hallé  	 
 T. pallens var. pallens 	 
 Tricalysia pangolina N.Hallé  	 
 Tricalysia parva Keay  	 
 Tricalysia patentipilis K.Krause  	 
 Tricalysia pedicellata Robbr. 
 Tricalysia pedunculosa (N.Hallé) Robbr.
 T. pedunculosa var. pilosula (N.Hallé) Robbr.  	 
 T. pedunculosa var. walkeriana (N.Hallé) Robbr.  	 
 Tricalysia perrieri Homolle ex Ranariv. & De Block  	 
 Tricalysia potamogala N.Hallé  	 
 Tricalysia pynaertii De Wild.  	 
 Tricalysia repens Robbr.  	 
 Tricalysia reticulata (Benth.) Hiern  	 
 Tricalysia revoluta Hutch.  	 
 Tricalysia schliebenii Robbr.  	 
 Tricalysia semidecidua Bridson  	 
 Tricalysia soyauxii K.Schum.  	 
 Tricalysia subsessilis K.Schum.  	 
 Tricalysia sylvae Robbr.  	  
 Tricalysia trachycarpa Robbr.  	 
 Tricalysia vadensis Robbr.  	 
 Tricalysia vanroechoudtii (Lebrun ex Van Roech.) Robbr.  	 
 Tricalysia velutina Robbr.  	 
 Tricalysia verdcourtiana Robbr.  	 
 Tricalysia wernhamiana (Hutch. & Dalziel) Keay
 Tricalysia wilksii O.Lachenaud  
 Tricalysia yangambiensis (N.Hallé) Robbr.  	 
 Tricalysia zambesiaca Robbr.

See also
 Empogona, formerly a subgenus of Tricalysia
 Hypobathrum of southeast Asia
 Kraussia, formerly under Tricalysia

References

Literature

 
Rubiaceae genera
Taxonomy articles created by Polbot